Cantonen Iron Kung Fu is a 1979 Hong Kong martial arts film written and directed by Lee Chiu and starring Bryan Leung as historical figure Leung Kwan, who was one of the Ten Tigers of Canton. Aside from starring in the lead role, Leung also worked on planning of the film.

Plot
Leung Kwan (Bryan Leung) is a coolie who gets to a fight with worker Yu (Lee Chiu) over a misunderstanding. While their misunderstanding was resolved, they become friends. Meanwhile, a corrupt businessman Black Eagle (Philip Ko) is planning to take over the supply routes. Yu stands up to him and challenges to fight several of his henchmen where he is killed as a result. After seeing this, Leung vows to seek revenge despite his lackluster martial arts skills. Leung then meets Master Lin Tao-hoi (Wong Hap), a merchant and martial arts instructor who becomes Leung's boss and mentor. Black Eagle then kills Lin and Leung's friends.  Later, Chen Sun (Wong Chung) a fighter who have been tracking Black Eagle from Northern China for six years, poses as a coolie where he meets Leung, and together, they join forces to take down Black Eagle.

Cast
Bryan Leung as Leung Kwan / Iron Bridge Three / 3rd Brother
Philip Ko as Black Eagle
Wong Chung as Chen Sun
Ting Wa-chung as Thief
Wong Hap as Lin Tao-hoi
Lee Teng-tsai
Tsang Chiu-yee
Lee Chiu as Yu
Ma Chin-ku
Pang San
Ching Kuo-chung
Lau Chun-fai
Pui Tak-wan
Law Kei
Yuen Kam-lun
Fang Ying
Hsiao Tu
Huang Chung
Au Lap-po as Food seller
Woo Hon-cheung

Reception

Critical
Mark Polland of Kung Fu Cinema rated the film three out of five stars and gave the film a mixed review noting its uneven pacing but praising Bryan Leung's performance.

Box office
The film grossed HK$1,020,687 at the Hong Kong box office during its theatrical run from 19 to 27 September 1979 in Hong Kong.

References

External links

Cantonen Iron Kung Fu at Hong Kong Cinemagic

1979 films
1979 martial arts films
1979 action films
Hong Kong action films
Hong Kong martial arts films
Kung fu films
Wushu films
1970s Cantonese-language films
Films set in Guangdong
Films set in 19th-century Qing dynasty
Hong Kong films about revenge
1970s Hong Kong films